Bernd Schröppel, M.D., is a former transplant nephrologist at the Mount Sinai Medical Center and the former Medical Director of the Kidney Pancreas Transplant Program at the Recanati/Miller Transplantation Institute at the Mount Sinai Medical Center in New York City. He is also a former Assistant Professor of Nephrology at the Mount Sinai School of Medicine.

Schröppel is the author of three book chapters and 44 peer-reviewed articles. He is a member of the American Society of Nephrology and the American Society of Transplantation.

Biography
Schröppel graduated summa cum laude with his medical degree in from the University of Ulm, Germany. He completed his residency training at Albert Einstein College of Medicine in New York, and his nephrology and transplant fellowship at Mount Sinai Hospital. 
Schröppel’s research interests are to characterize the innate immune response in transplantation and to identify therapeutic strategies to improve transplant survival. The other focus of his lab is to study molecular tools (SNP analysis, gene expression profiling, and differential expression of microRNA) in order to predict or detect complications (e.g. rejection, delayed graft function) after clinical transplantation. 
He was named Medical Director of Mount Sinai's Kidney and Pancreas Transplant Program in January, 2009.

Grants
Principal Investigator, Contribution of Toll-like receptor signaling in islet transplantation, NIH/NIAID
Principal Investigator, Genetic and immune markers to predict HCV recurrence after liver transplantation. Prospective study in liver transplant recipients to identify genetic and molecular innate immune markers that predict HCV recurrence. American Society of Transplant Surgeons (ASTS) – Pfizer mid-level faculty award.

Honors and awards
1994 Summa Cum Laude, University of Ulm, Germany
1997 Fesenius medical thesis research award of the University of Ulm, Germany
1998 Jan Brod research award of the University of Hannover, Germany
2005 American Society of Transplant Surgeons (ASTS) Vanguard Prize
2005 Norman S. Coplon Grant, Satellite Research Award
2007 Louis R. Wasserman Medical Scholar Career Development Award
2009 Dr. Harold and Golden Lamport Research Award
2010 ASTS - Pfizer mid-level faculty Award

Book chapters
Schröppel B, Heeger P. Transplantation Immunology. In: Kidney Transplantation State of the Art. Hricik DE (Ed.). Second edition, London, UK: Remedica Group, 2007.
Schröppel B, Akalin E. Transplant Immunology and Immunosuppression. In: Therapy in Nephrology and Hypertension: a companion to Brenner & Rector's The Kidney, Third Edition, by Christopher S. Wilcox, MD, published by Saunders, Elsevier Inc. 2008
Gurkan S, Schröppel B, Murphy B. Immunology of Organ Transplantation. In: Pathology of Organ Transplantation, Springer 2011

Publications
Partial list:
Zhang N, Schröppel B, Lal G, Jakubzick C, Mao X, Chen D, Yin N, Jessberger R, Ochando JC, Ding Y, Bromberg JS. Regulatory T cells sequentially migrate from the site of tissue inflammation to the draining LN to suppress allograft rejection. Immunity, 30:458-469, 2009. 
Krüger B, Krick S, Dhillon N, Lerner S, Ames S, Bromberg JS, Lin M, Walsh L, Vella J, Fischereder M, Krämer B, Colvin RB, Heeger P, Murphy B, Schröppel B. Donor Toll-like receptor 4 contributes to ischemia and reperfusion injury following human kidney transplantation. Proc Natl Acad Sci U S A, 106(9):3390-3395, 2009. 
Ju W, Eichinger F, Bitzer M, Oh J, McWeeney S, Berthier CC, Shedden K, Cohen C, Henger A, Krick S, Kopp J, Stoeckert C, Dikman S, Schröppel B, Thomas D, Schlondorff D, Kretzler M, Bottinger E. Renal Gene and Protein Expression Signatures for Prediction of Kidney Disease Progression. Am J Pathol, 174(6):2073-85, 2009. 
Rafiq MA, de Boccardo G, Schröppel B, Bromberg JS, Sehgal V, Dinavahi R, Murphy B, Akalin E. Differential outcomes in 3 types of acute antibody-mediated rejection. Clin Transplant. 2009. 
Dhillon N, Liron W, Krüger B, Mehrotra A, Ward S, Godbold J, Radwan M, Schiano T, Murphy B, Schröppel B. Complement C3 allotypes and outcomes in liver transplantation. Liver Transplantation, 16:198-203, 2010. 
Schröppel B, Krüger B, Walsh L, Harris S, Garrison K, Himmelfarb J, Lerner S, Bromberg J, Zhang P, Bonventre J, Wang Z, Farris A, Colvin R, Murphy B, Vella J, Tubular expression of KIM-1 does not predict delayed function after transplantation, J Am Soc Nephrol, 21:536-542, 2010. 
Zhang N, Krüger B, Lal G, Luan Y, Yadav A, Zang W, Grimm M, Waaga-Gasser AM, Murphy B, Bromberg JS, Schröppel B. Inhibition of TLR4 signaling prolongs Treg-dependent murine islet allograft survival, Immunol Letters, 127:119-125, 2010. 
Dhillon N, Walsh L, Krüger B, Ward SC, Godbold JH, Radwan M, Schiano T, Murphy BT, Schröppel B. A single nucleotide polymorphism of Toll-like receptor 4 identifies the risk of developing graft failure after liver transplantation. J Hepatology, in press. 
Lin M, Yin N, Murphy B, Medof ME, Segerer S, Heeger PS, Schröppel B. Immune cell-derived c3 is required for autoimmune diabetes induced by multiple low doses of streptozotocin. Diabetes, 59(9):2247-52, 2010. 
Krüger B, Yin N, Zhang N, Yadav A, Coward W, Lal G, Zang W, S Heeger P, Bromberg JS, Murphy B, Schröppel B. Islet-expressed TLR2 and TLR4 sense injury and mediate early graft failure after transplantation. Eur J Immunol, 40(10):2914-24, 2010. 
Gurkan S, Luan Y, Dhillon N, Allam SA, Montague T, Bromberg JS, Ames S, Lerner S, Ebcioglu Z, Nair V, Dinavahi R, Sehgal V, Heeger P, Schröppel B, Murphy B. Immune reconstitution following rabbit antithymocyte globulin. Am J Trans 10:2132-2141, 2010 
Lal G, Yin N, Xu J, Lin M, Schröppel B, Ding Y, Marie I, Levy DE,  Bromberg JS. Distinct inflammatory signals have physiologically divergent effects on epigenetic regulation of Foxp3 expression and Treg function, Am J Transplantation, 11(2):203-214, 2011. 
Dinavahi R, George A,  Tretin A, Akalin E, Ames S, Bromberg JS, DiPaola N, Lerner S, Mehrotra A, Murphy B, Nadasdy T, Arta E, Salomon DR, Schröppel B, Sehgal V,  Sachidanandam R, Heeger P. Antibodies Reactive to Non-HLA Antigens in Transplant Glomerulopathy. JASN, in press

References

External links
Mount Sinai Medical Center homepage
Mount Sinai School of Medicine homepage
The Recanati / Miller Transplantation Institute homepage

Year of birth missing (living people)
Living people
People from Aulendorf
German transplant surgeons
American nephrologists
University of Ulm alumni
Icahn School of Medicine at Mount Sinai faculty